Christopher Alexander Millar (born 30 March 1983) is a Scottish footballer who plays as a midfielder for Kilwinning Rangers.

Millar was in the Celtic youth system, then started his professional career with Greenock Morton. He then played for St Johnstone for 10 seasons, helping them win the Scottish Cup in 2014. Millar returned to Morton in 2018.

Career
Millar was born in Glasgow. After being released by Celtic in February 2003, Millar signed for then Scottish Football League Third Division side Greenock Morton.

Morton
Millar made his Morton debut away at Montrose on 25 February 2003. He was a member of Morton's 2002–03 Scottish Third Division championship-winning team that season.

On 21 December 2007, it was announced that Millar had signed a pre-contract agreement with St Johnstone. He officially signed with the club on 1 May 2008.

St Johnstone
Millar helped St Johnstone win the 2008–09 Scottish First Division and promotion to the Scottish Premier League. Millar continued to play regularly for St Johnstone in the top flight and helped the club win the 2013–14 Scottish Cup. He signed a two-year contract with St Johnstone in January 2015.

Having completed 10 years of service, Millar was granted a testimonial by St Johnstone in 2018. Manager Tommy Wright said in May 2018 that Millar would be released at the end of the 2017–18 season.

Return to Morton
After leaving St Johnstone, Millar signed again with Morton on a one-year deal.

On 27 May 2019, it was announced Millar had committed himself to the club until 10 June 2020.

East Kilbride 
Millar signed with East Kilbride on 9 June 2021. He was named as club captain by ex-teammate Stephen Aitken.

Kilwinning Rangers 
After a season at the K-Park, Millar moved to Ayrshire West of Scotland Football League side Kilwinning Rangers on a one-year deal.

Career statistics

Honours
St Johnstone
 First Division: 2008–09
 Scottish Cup: 2013–2014

Greenock Morton
 Second Division: 2006–07
 Third Division: 2002–03

Kilwinning Rangers
 Eglinton Cup: 2022

References

External links

 (5 games in 2002–03 with wrong spelling of surname)

1983 births
Association football midfielders
Celtic F.C. players
Greenock Morton F.C. non-playing staff
Greenock Morton F.C. players
Living people
Scottish footballers
West of Scotland Football League players
Scottish Football League players
Scottish Premier League players
Scottish Professional Football League players
Footballers from Glasgow
St Johnstone F.C. players
East Kilbride F.C. players
Lowland Football League players
Kilwinning Rangers F.C. players